The 66th annual Venice International Film Festival, held in Venice, Italy, was held from 2 to 12 September 2009, with Maria Grazia Cucinotta serving as the festival's hostess. The opening film of the festival was Baarìa by Giuseppe Tornatore and the closing film was Chengdu, I Love You by Fruit Chan and Cui Jian. The international competition jury, chaired by Ang Lee, awarded the Golden Lion to Lebanon by Samuel Maoz.

Juries
The international juries of the 66th Venice International Film Festival were composed as follows:

Main competition (Venezia 66)
 Ang Lee, Taiwanese director, screenwriter and producer (Jury President)
 Sergei Bodrov, Russian director, screenwriter and producer
 Sandrine Bonnaire, French actress, director and screenwriter
 Liliana Cavani, Italian director and screenwriter 
 Joe Dante, American director, producer, editor and actor
 Anurag Kashyap, Indian director, writer, producer and actor
 Luciano Ligabue,  Italian director, writer and singer-songwriter

Horizons (Orizzonti)
 Pere Portabella, Spanish politician, director, and producer (President)
 Bady Minck, Luxembourger filmmaker and artist
 Gina Kim, South Korean filmmaker and academic
 Garin Nugroho, Indonesian director
 Gianfranco Rosi, Italian director, cinematographer, producer and screenwriter

Opera Prima ("Luigi de Laurentiis" Award for a Debut Film)
 Haile Gerima, Ethiopian filmmaker (President)
 Ramin Bahrani, American director and screenwriter
 Gianni Di Gregorio, Italian director, screenwriter and actor
 Antoine Fuqua, American director and producer
 Sam Taylor-Wood, English filmmaker and photographer

Corto-Cortissimo (Short Film Competition)
 Stuart Gordon American filmmaker, theatre director, screenwriter and playwright (President)
 Steve Ricci, Italian cinematographer, screenwriter and editor
 Sitora Alieva, Russian artistic director of the International Film Festival Kinotav

Controcampo Italiano
 Carlo Lizzani, Italian director, screenwriter and critic (President)
 Giulio Questi, Italian director and screenwriter
 Marina Sanna, Italian chief editor of cinema magazine

Official selection

In competition
The following films competed for the Golden Lion:

Highlighted title indicates Golden Lion for best film.

Out of competition
The following films were screened as Out of competition:

Short film competition
The following films were selected for the Short film competition (Corto Cortissimo) section:

Highlighted title indicates Corto Cortissimo Lion winner.

Horizons
The following films were selected for the Horizons (Orizzonti) section:

{| class="sortable wikitable" style="width:95%; margin-top:2px; margin-bottom:0px"
! colspan=3| Horizons Events
|-
! Title
! Director(s)
! Production country
|-
| Armando Testa - Povero ma moderno (documentary) || data-sort-value="Corsicato"| Pappi Corsicato || Italy
|-
|  data-sort-value="Marriage"|The Marriage (documentary, short) || data-sort-value="Greenaway"| Peter Greenaway || Italy, Spain
|-
| Reading Book of Blockade (Chitaem 'Blokadnuju knigu) (documentary) || data-sort-value="Sokurov"| Alexander Sokurov || Russia
|-
| data-sort-value="Death"| The Death of Pentheus (short) || data-sort-value="Haas"| Philip Haas || United States
|-
| data-sort-value="Bohème"| La Bohème (short) || data-sort-value="Herzog"| Werner Herzog || United Kingdom
|-
| Faces of Seoul (aka Seo-wool eui ul-gul) (documentary) || data-sort-value=" Kim"| Gina Kim || United States, South Korea
|-
| Hugo en Afrique (documentary) || data-sort-value="Knuchel"| Stefano Knuchel || Switzerland
|-
| Via della croce (documentary) || data-sort-value="Nono"| Serena Nono || Italy
|-
| Mudanza (short) || data-sort-value="Portabella"| Pere Portabella || Spain
|-
| Deserto rosa. Luigi Ghirri (documentary) || data-sort-value="Sgarbi"| Elisabetta Sgarbi || Italy
|-
| data-sort-value="Danse"| La danse - Le ballet de l'Opéra de Paris (documentary) || data-sort-value="Wiseman"| Frederick Wiseman || United States
|-
| Cock-Crow (55 min) || data-sort-value="Zamagni"| David Zamagni, Nadia Ranocchi || Italy
|-
| Daimon (49 min) || data-sort-value="Zamagni"| David Zamagni, Nadia Ranocchi || Italy 
|}
Highlighted title indicates the Lion of the Future winner

Golden Lion for Lifetime Achievement
As part of the Golden Lion for Lifetime Achievement 2009, which was conferred to John Lasseter and the Directors of Disney-Pixar, the following American animation films were presented:
 The Incredibles by Brad Bird
 Up by Pete Docter, Bob Peterson (screenplay)
 Toy Story 3-D by John Lasseter
 Toy Story 2 3-D by John Lasseter, Lee Unkrich, Ash Brannon
 Finding Nemo by Andrew Stanton, Lee Unkrich

Cortocampo Italiano
The following films, representing "new trends in Italian cinema", were screened in this section:

These Phantoms 2
For this retrospective section on Italian cinema, 39 feature and 26 short films were screened, including documentaries. The films were mainly from the period 1946 - 1971, with a few only films going back to the 1930s and reaching up to 2009.This is a list of the fiction feature films screened:

Autonomous sections
Venice International Film Critics' Week
The following films were selected for the 24th International Film Critics' Week:* Special Event in collaboration with Venice Days

Venice Days
The following films were selected for the 6th edition of Venice Days (Giornate Degli Autori) autonomous section:

Awards
Official selection
The following Official Awards were conferred at the 66th edition of the festival:In competition (Venezia 66)Golden Lion: Lebanon by Samuel Maoz
Silver Lion for Best Director: Shirin Neshat for Women Without Men
Special Jury Prize: Soul Kitchen by Fatih Akın
Volpi Cup for Best Actor: Colin Firth, for A Single Man
Volpi Cup for Best Actress: Kseniya Rappoport, for The Double Hour
Marcello Mastroianni Award, for the best emerging actor or actress: Jasmine Trinca for The Big Dream
Golden Osella for Outstanding Technical Contribution: Sylvie Olivé for Mr. Nobody 
Golden Osella for Best Screenplay: Todd Solondz for Life During WartimeHorizons awards (Premi Orizzonti) Best Film: Engkwentro by Pepe Diokno
 Best Documentary: 1428 by Haibin Du
 Special mention: The Man's Woman and Other Stories by Amit DuttaLion of the Future Luigi De Laurentiis Award for a Debut Film: Engkwentro by Pepe Diokno (Horizons)Short Film awards (Corto Cortissimo Lion) Best Short Film: Firstborn (Eersgeborene) by Etienne Kallos
 Venice Nomination to the European Film Awards 2009: Sinner by Meni Philip
 Special mention: Felicità by Salomé AleksiControcampo Italiano Best Feature Film: Cosmonaut by Susanna Nicchiarelli
 Special Mention: In the Eyes (Negli occhi) by Francesco Del Grosso, Daniele AnzellottiSpecial awards Golden Lion for life achievement: John Lasseter and the directors of Disney-Pixar (Brad Bird, Pete Docter, Andrew Stanton, Lee Unkrich
 Jaeger-Le Coultre Glory to the Filmmaker Award: Sylvester Stallone
 Persol 3-D Award for Best Stereoscopic Film: The Hole by Joe Dante (Out of competition)

Autonomous sections
The following collateral awards were conferred to films of the autonomous sections:Venice International Film Critics' Week "Region of Veneto for quality cinema" Award: Tehroun by Takmil Homayoun Nader
 Future Film Festival Digital Award: Metropia by Tarik Saleh 
 Special Mention: Up by Pete DocterVenice Days (Giornati degli Autori) Label Europa Cinemas Award: The Last Days of Emma Blank by Alex van Warmerdam

Other collateral awards
The following collateral awards were conferred to films of the official selection:

 FIPRESCI Award:
 Best Film (Main competition): Lourdes by Jessica Hausner
 Best Film (Horizons): Adrift (Choi voi) by Bui Thac Chuyen
 SIGNIS Award: Lourdes by Jessica Hausner
 Special mention: Lebanon by Samuel Maoz
 Francesco Pasinetti Award (SNGCI): 
 Best Film: The White Space (Lo spazio bianco) by Francesca Comencini
 Best Director: Giuseppe Tornatore for Baarìa
 Best Actor: Filippo Timi for The Double Hour
 Best Actress: Margherita Buy for The White Space
 Special award: Riccardo Scamarcio for The Big Dream
 Special award: Armando Testa – Povero ma moderno by Pappi Corsicato (Horizons)
 Leoncino d'oro Agiscuola Award: Capitalism: A Love Story by Michael Moore
 La Navicella – Venezia Cinema Award: Lourdes by Jessica Hausner
 C.I.C.T. UNESCO Enrico Fulchignoni Award: The Traveller (Al-Musafir) by Ahmad Maher
 UNICEF Award: Women Without Men by Shirin Neshat
 Christopher D. Smithers Foundation Special Award: Bad Lieutenant: Port of Call New Orleans by Werner Herzog
 Biografilm Lancia Award:
 Best Fiction Film: Mr. Nobody by Jaco Van Dormael
 Best Documentary: In the Eyes (Negli occhi) by Francesco Del Grosso & Daniele Anzellotti (Cortocampo Italiano)
 Queer Lion''' for the best LGBT-themed movie: A Single Man by Tom Ford
 Brian Prize by UAAR: Lourdes by Jessica Hausner
 Lanterna Magica Award (Cgs): Cosmonauta by Susanna Nicchiarelli (Cortocampo Italiano)
 FEDIC Award: The White Space (Lo spazio bianco) by Francesca Comencini
 Special Mention: What Do You Know About Me by Valerio Jalongo
 Arca Cinemagiovani Awards:
 Best Film: Soul Kitchen by Fatih Akin
 Best Italian Film: The Double Hour (La doppia ora) by Giuseppe Capotondi
 Lina Mangiacapre Award: Scheherazade, Tell Me a Story (Ehky ya Schahrazad) by Yousry Nasrallah (Out of competition)
 Air For Film Fest Award: The White Space (Lo spazio bianco) by Francesca Comencini
 Open Award 2009: Capitalism: A love story by Michael Moore
 Gianni Astrei Award: The White Space (Lo spazio bianco'') by Francesca Comencini

References

External links

Venice Film Festival 2009 Awards on IMDb

Venice Film Festival
Venice Film Festival
Venice Film Festival
Venice Film Festival
Film
September 2009 events in Europe